Antias, a name derived from the Roman colony of Antium, may refer to:

 Anteias or Antias, mythological founder of Antium
 Lucius Valerius Antias, Roman general
 Valerius Antias, Roman annalist

See also